"Popopop" is a song by French rapper Gambi, released on 4 October 2019. The song topped the singles chart in France.

Charts

Weekly charts

Year-end charts

Certifications

References

2019 singles
2019 songs
French-language songs
French hip hop songs
Number-one singles in France